Encephalartos ngoyanus is a species of cycad in Ngoye Forest, in KwaZulu-Natal, South Africa.

Description
The stem is 30 cm high for a diameter of 15–20 cm. The leaves are 50 to 150 cm long, dark green in color, with leaflets that branch off opposite to an angle of 180° from the rachis and that are reduced to thorns towards the base of the leaf. It is a dioecious species, with yellow, ovoid male cones 20–25 cm long by 5–7 cm in diameter, and yellow, ovoid female cones 25 cm long by 12–15 cm in diameter. The seeds are oblong in shape, 25–30 mm long and 15–20 mm wide, with a red sarcotesta.

References

External links
 
 

ngoyanus